Nicola Pellow is an English mathematician and information scientist who was one of the nineteen members of the WWW Project at CERN working with Tim Berners-Lee. She joined the project in November 1990, while an undergraduate maths student enrolled on a sandwich course at Leicester Polytechnic (now De Montfort University). Pellow recalled having little experience with programming languages, "... apart from using a bit of Pascal and FORTRAN as part of my degree course."

Almost immediately after Berners-Lee completed the WorldWideWeb web browser for the NeXT platform  Pellow was tasked with creating a browser using her recently acquired skills in the C programming language. The outcome was that she wrote the first generic Line Mode Browser that could run on non-NeXT systems. The WWW team began to improve on her work, creating several experimental versions. Pellow was involved in porting the browser to different types of computers.

She left CERN at the end of August 1991 but returned after graduating in 1992 to work with Robert Cailliau on MacWWW, the first web browser for the classic Mac OS.

See also
History of the World Wide Web
Internet pioneers

Libwww

References

External links
 Archive of "People involved in the WorldWideWeb project"

Alumni of De Montfort University
Living people
Year of birth missing (living people)
Women Internet pioneers
British women computer scientists
People associated with CERN